Yuan Jiang (c. 1671–c. 1746); was a Chinese landscape painter who lived in the Qing dynasty (1644–1912). He served at the imperial palace during the Yongzheng era (1722–1735).

Yuan was born in Yangzhou in Jiangsu province. He was part of an artistic family; his nephew Yuan Yao was also a landscape painter. Yuan painted landscapes and garrets, as well as bird-and-flower paintings and paintings of beasts. His landscapes and garrets contained accurate compositions and minute details that were suitable for construction.

Notes

References
 Zhongguo gu dai shu hua jian ding zu (中国古代书画鑑定组). 2001. Zhongguo hui hua quan ji (中国绘画全集). Zhongguo mei shu fen lei quan ji. Beijing: Wen wu chu ban she. Volume 26.

Painters from Yangzhou
Qing dynasty landscape painters
Year of death unknown
Year of birth unknown